Maharaja Institute of Technology Mysore (MIT Mysore) was started in the year 2007, by Maharaja Educational Trust(R).

Description 
MIT Mysore is an engineering college recognized by the Government of Karnataka and the All India Council of Technical Education (AICTE), New Delhi, affiliated to the Visvesvaraya Technological University (VTU), Belagavi. The Institution Accredited by National Board of Accreditation (NBA)

Location
It is situated at Belavadi Village, Srirangapatna Taluk, Mandya District about 3 km from Columbia Asia Hospital Junction Mysore at beautiful, enchanting and sprawling landscape

Academics programs 
The Institution has five undergraduate programmes, three postgraduate programmes, and one Diploma Programme. 

Undergraduate programmes

Postgraduate programmes

Activities
MIT Mysore conducts its annual fest during February or March every year. It has also conducted many Job Fairs with maximum campus recruitment.

Campus
It has three buildings. The main building contains all the undergraduate branches, Second Building for basic science departments namely Mathematics, Physics and Chemistry where as the third building called PG Block houses the MBA and MCA departments.

References

Engineering colleges in Mysore
2007 establishments in Karnataka
Educational institutions established in 2007